Soft Sands is a 1957 studio album by Oscar Peterson, arranged by Buddy Bregman.

Track listing
 "Soft Sands" (Carroll Coates)
 "On the Outside Looking In"
 "It Happens Every Spring"
 "Chanel" (Piero Umiliani)
 "You Took Advantage of Me" (Lorenz Hart, Richard Rodgers)
 "Why, Oh Why"
 "Song to the Stars"
 "Echoes"
 "I've Never Left your Arms"
 "I Can't Get Started" (Vernon Duke, Ira Gershwin) 
 "Dream on a Summer Night"
 "Susquehanna"

Personnel

Performance
 Oscar Peterson – piano, vocal
 Ray Brown – double bass
 Herb Ellis - guitar
 Stan Levey - drums
 Buddy Bregman – arranger, conductor

References

1957 albums
Oscar Peterson albums
Albums arranged by Buddy Bregman
Albums produced by Norman Granz
Verve Records albums
Albums conducted by Buddy Bregman